Bansko Peak (\'vrɣx 'banskɔ\) is a  rocky peak in the eastern extremity of the Delchev Ridge in the Tangra Mountains of Livingston Island.  The peak was named after the town of Bansko in southwestern Bulgaria.

Location

See also
 List of Bulgarian toponyms in Antarctica
 Antarctic Place-names Commission

Maps
 L.L. Ivanov et al. Antarctica: Livingston Island and Greenwich Island, South Shetland Islands. Scale 1:100000 topographic map. Sofia: Antarctic Place-names Commission of Bulgaria, 2005.
 L.L. Ivanov. Antarctica: Livingston Island and Greenwich, Robert, Snow and Smith Islands. Scale 1:120000 topographic map.  Troyan: Manfred Wörner Foundation, 2009. (Second edition 2010.)

Notes

References
 Bansko Peak. SCAR Composite Gazetteer of Antarctica
 Bulgarian Antarctic Gazetteer. Antarctic Place-names Commission. (details in Bulgarian, basic data in English)

External links
 Bansko Peak. Copernix satellite image

Tangra Mountains
Mountains of the South Shetland Islands